Toni Comas is a  film director and writer, born in 1971 in Spain.

Biography 
Comas was born as Antonio Comas Torres. Among his works are his documentary Building Stories for PBS about Donald Trump and his architect. His latest movie Indiana has been received at the Fantasia film festival and Sitges film festival with much success among the critics. As a writer, Comas was awarded for his work in the movie Bag Boy Lover Boy with which he won the best script award at the New York horror festival.

Awards 
Special Mention, Chernobyl, 1986 - Sitges Film Festival 2019
Best script "Bag Boy, Lover Boy" - New York Horror Film Festival. 2018
Best Movie "Indiana" - Jim Thorpe Independent Film Festival. 2018
Nominated Best Director "Indiana" - Madrid International Film Festival. 2017
Nominated Best Director "Indiana" - Nice International Film Festival. 2018
Best Director "I fix Everything" - Film Racing 2013
Best Movie "I fix Everything" - Film Racing 2013
Best Script "I fix Everything" - Film Racing 2013
Best Script "Belo York" - Film Racing 2017

Filmography

Director 

 2018 :  CHERNOBYL 1986
 2017 : Indiana 
 2017 : Bello York
 2013 : Building Stories 
 2011 : I Fix Everything

Writer 

 2017 : Indiana]] 
 2017 : Bello York
 2014 : Glance Up
 2014: Bag Boy Lover Boy
 2011 : I Fix Everything

External links 

 

American documentary film directors
Spanish documentary film directors
Living people
1971 births